George Harry Booth-Grey, 6th Earl of Stamford and 2nd Earl of Warrington (31 October 1765 – 26 April 1845), styled Lord Grey from 1768 to 1819, was a British peer and parliamentarian.

Booth-Grey was the eldest son of George Grey, 5th Earl of Stamford and his wife, Henrietta Cavendish Bentinck.

He was educated at Winchester College and Trinity College, Cambridge. From 1790 to 1796, he was the Whig Member of Parliament for Aldeburgh. He contested both Grampound and St Germans, losing the former but representing the latter from 1796 to 1802.

In 1819 he succeeded his father as Earl of Stamford and Warrington, inheriting the family estates at Enville, Staffordshire, Bradgate Park in Leicestershire, Dunham Massey in Cheshire and Stalybridge in Lancashire. He was appointed Lord Lieutenant of Cheshire in 1819, and in 1827, succeeded George Cholmondeley, 1st Marquess of Cholmondeley as Vice-Admiral and Chamberlain of the county.

On 23 December 1797, Grey married Henrietta Charlotte Elizabeth Charteris, sister of Francis Douglas, 8th Earl of Wemyss.

They lived at Enville Hall, the family seat, and had five children:

George Harry (1802–1835), later Baron Grey of Groby by writ of acceleration, married Catherine Charteris Wemyss in 1824, and had:
George Harry Booth-Grey, his successor
Margaret Henrietta Maria (1825–1852), married Henry John Milbank
Henrietta Charlotte (1799–1866), married James Thomas Law (a priest; son of George Henry Law, Bishop of Chester and of Bath and Wells)
Maria (17 December 1800 – 4 May 1821)
Jane (1804–1877), married John Walsh (later Baron Ormathwaite).
Henry Booth

On Stamford's death at Enville Hall in 1845, his senior titles devolved upon his grandson, George Grey who succeeded as the 7th and 3rd Earl, since his father who was summoned as the 8th Baron Grey of Groby in 1832 had predeceased him in 1835.

See also 
 Dunham Massey
 Earl of Warrington

References

External links
 www.burkespeerage.com

|-

|-

|-

1765 births
1845 deaths
18th-century English nobility
19th-century English nobility
George
Grey, George Grey, Lord
Grey, George Grey, Lord
Lord-Lieutenants of Cheshire
Grey, George Grey, Lord
Grey, George Grey, Lord
Grey, George Grey, Lord
UK MPs who inherited peerages
Grey, George Grey, Lord
Members of the Parliament of the United Kingdom for constituencies in Cornwall
Earls of Stamford
Earls of Warrington
Hulme Trust
Barons Grey of Groby